Tianmu Lake is a lake which is  south of Liyang City in Jiangsu Province, China. It was listed as a provincial tourist resort in 1993 and is currently graded an AAAA nature reserve after being graded as such in 2001. The lake enjoys a legal conservation status, and since the municipal government took action in 1995 to overhaul the sewage disposal systems around the lake, the water quality has been in a good condition, achieving the second highest rating for water quality. As such, the lake is home to many freshwater fish such as cod.

Surrounding area 
In the surrounding area of the lake (known as the Tianmu Lake Scenic Area), wild animals such as mallard, pheasant and wild boar live. Some animals are also kept in captivity and fed by humans, such as a camel. The largest production of this area is tea. The production of tea each year here reaches .
Around the lake, there are also two other China AAAA-level tourist resort called "South Hill Bamboo Sea" (also called NanShan Zhu Hai) and "Yushui Hot Spring".

South Hill Bamboo Sea 
South Hill Bamboo Sea or in pinyin Nanshan Zhuhai), south of Tianmu Lake, is an area of 35 thousand acres of millions of bamboo plants, flowing streams and a sculpture. The Bamboo Culture Park provides information about the cultural meaning of bamboo. It also offers mountain climbing.

References 

Nature reserves in China
Lakes of Jiangsu
Tourist attractions in Jiangsu
AAAA-rated tourist attractions